Bukkamakhi (Dargwa: Букъамахьи) is a rural locality (a selo) in Kassagumakhinsky Selsoviet, Akushinsky District, Republic of Dagestan, Russia. The population was 62 as of 2010.

Geography 
Bukkamakhi is located 47 km south of Akusha (the district's administrative centre) by road, on the Karakotta River. Karashimakhi is the nearest rural locality.

References 

Rural localities in Akushinsky District